The 2022–23 season is the 98th season in the history of BSC Young Boys and their 27th consecutive season in the top flight. The club are participating in Swiss Super League, Swiss Cup and UEFA Europa Conference League.

Players

Out on loan

Transfers

In

Out

Pre-season and friendlies

Competitions

Overall record

Swiss Super League

League table

Results summary

Results by round

Matches 
The league fixtures were announced on 17 June 2022.

Swiss Cup

UEFA Europa Conference League

Second qualifying round

Third qualifying round 
The draw for the third qualifying round was held on 18 July 2022.

Play-off round 
The draw for the play-off round was held on 2 August 2022.

References 

BSC Young Boys seasons
Young Boys